The Chinese Literature Press (中国文学出版社) is a state-owned book publisher in China established in 1951, focusing on translating Chinese literature into other languages.

Since the 1980s, more than 200 titles have been published by the press in English and French as their "Panda Book Series".

References

Publishing companies of China